General elections were held in Fiji on 14 November 2018. The result was a victory for the ruling FijiFirst party of Prime Minister Frank Bainimarama, which received just over 50% of the vote and 27 of the 51 seats in Parliament, a loss of five seats. The main opposition party, Social Democratic Liberal Party, gained six seats, whilst the National Federation Party retained its three seats.

The elections also saw female representation in Parliament rise to nearly 20 percent, with 10 of the 51 members being women.

Background and campaign
On 10 March, SODELPA launched their party manifesto for the election in Sydney, making it the first time a Fijian political party has launched their party manifesto overseas. The event attracted many supporters among the Fijian diaspora, especially Fijian Australians.

On 30 September, Prime Minister Frank Bainimarama announced that the elections would be held on 14 November 2018. President Jioji Konrote subsequently dissolved parliament in accordance with section 58(3) of the constitution, on the advice of the Prime Minister.

234 candidates representing six political parties contested in the elections. 56 of the candidates were women. Candidate numbers for the ballot paper were drawn on 18 October. The Labour Party and Freedom Alliance Party presented a combined party list under the Labour Party banner.

During a campaign rally, FijiFirst leader Frank Bainimarama stated that he wanted to win all 51 parliamentary seats and govern without an opposition, arguing that the two main opposition parties represented i-Taukei and Indo-Fijian interests rather than all Fijians. The SODELPA party promised to restore the Great Council of Chiefs within a hundred days if elected, and to consider changing the electoral system to restore communal constituencies. They later explicitly promised to restore the 1997 constitution.

During the election campaign SODELPA leader Sitiveni Rabuka was tried and acquitted on charges of falsely declaring his assets and liabilities to the Supervisor of Elections. An appeal by the Fiji Independent Commission Against Corruption, which could have resulted in Rabuka's disqualification two days from the poll, was dismissed, with FICAC ordered to pay costs. Shortly before the appeal was decided Rabuka was again called in by police on unspecified charges.

On election day, voting was suspended at 26 polling stations due to torrential rain and flooding. Ballots cast at those stations were shredded. Polling recommenced with fresh ballot papers on Saturday 17 November.

Electoral system

The 51 members of Parliament were elected from a single nationwide constituency by open list proportional representation with an electoral threshold of 5%. Seats are allocated using the d'Hondt method.

Prior to the election the Electoral Commission increased the number of seats from 50 to 51 in accordance with section 54 of the Fiji constitution to maintain the ratio of population to seats. The commission determined the ratio in 2014 was one seat for every 17,472 citizens. With the Fiji Bureau of Statistics projecting a population of 886,416 as of 1 March 2017 achieving the same ratio would require 50.73 seats which the commission rounded up to 51 for the 2018 election.

Schedule
Key dates relating to the general election were as follows:

Opinion polls

Results

By division

Aftermath
The ruling FijiFirst Party lost 5 seats, but retained a majority in Parliament. FijiFirst leader Frank Bainimarama blamed poor weather for the loss of votes. Bainimarama was sworn in as Prime Minister on 20 November 2018.

Reactions
Australian foreign minister Marise Payne congratulated Bainimarama's re-election in an official statement.

See also
List of members of the Parliament of Fiji (2018–2022)

References

Fiji
2018 in Fiji
Elections in Fiji
November 2018 events in Oceania